Mehdi Kerrouche (born 11 October 1985) is a French footballer who plays as a striker.

Club career
Born in Douai, France and of Algerian descent, Kerrouche started his senior career playing for AC Cambrai in the French CFA2. In 2007, he left the club to try his luck in the Belgian Second Division with K.S.K. Ronse.

USM Alger
On 18 August 2007, Kerrouche signed a one-year contract with Algerian club USM Alger.

GFCO Ajaccio
He played the 2008–09 season with GFCO Ajaccio in the French CFA. He made 18 appearances, scoring twelve goals.

Naval
In August 2009, Kerrouche signed with Associação Naval 1º de Maio. On 11 September 2009, he made his debut for the club as a starter in a league game against Vitória.

Swindon Town
In July 2011, Kerrouche signed a two-year contract with English Football League Two side Swindon Town, subject to international clearance. On 10 September 2011, Kerrouche scored his first goal in a 2–0 victory over Southend United. Three days later, he scored twice against Crawley Town in a 3–0 win. On 24 September 2011, Kerrouche scored again against Barnet. On 8 October 2011, Kerrouche scored again in a 3–3 draw against Hereford United. On 5 November 2011, Kerrouche scored his first penalty for Swindon Town in a 2–0 win over Port Vale. On 12 November 2011, he scored his first FA Cup goal, having come on as a substitute during a 4–1 defeat of Huddersfield Town of League One.

Loan at Oxford United
On 9 February 2012, he joined bitter local rivals Oxford United on a one-month loan. Oxford United need cover over striker crisis after losing strikers like Jon-Paul Pittman, Alfie Potter and Tom Craddock. On 14 February 2012, he made his debut for Oxford United in a 2–1 win over Dagenham & Redbridge, giving the club their first match in February. Kerrouche returned to Swindon after his loan spell with Oxford came to an end.

CS Constantine
Kerrouche returned to Algeria joining Ligue 1 side CS Constantine on a three-years deal.

References

External links

1985 births
Living people
People from Douai
Sportspeople from Nord (French department)
Footballers from Hauts-de-France
Association football forwards
French footballers
French sportspeople of Algerian descent
Associação Naval 1º de Maio players
RC Lens players
Gazélec Ajaccio players
FC Les Lilas players
USM Alger players
Swindon Town F.C. players
Oxford United F.C. players
CS Constantine players
English Football League players
Primeira Liga players
French expatriate sportspeople in Belgium
Expatriate footballers in Portugal
Expatriate footballers in Algeria
Expatriate footballers in the United Arab Emirates
Expatriate footballers in Greece
Expatriate footballers in Belgium
French expatriate sportspeople in the United Arab Emirates
French expatriate sportspeople in Greece
French expatriate sportspeople in Portugal
French expatriate sportspeople in Algeria